Simmozheim is a town in the district of Calw in Baden-Württemberg in Germany.

History
From 1341 to 1442, Herrenalb Abbey slowly acquired title over Simmozheim. That district was reorganized in 1938 as Landkreis Calw and Simmozheim remained in its jurisdiction. Simmozheim has grown substantially since World War II, primarily to its south, west, and east.

Geography
The municipality (Gemeinde) of Simmozheim is found at the northeast edge of the district of Calw, along its border with the district of Böblingen. Elevation above sea level in the municipal area ranges from a high of  Normalnull (NN) to a low of  NN.

Portions of the Federally protected  and  nature reserves are located in Simmozheim's municipal area.

Politics
Simmozheim has one borough (Ortsteil), Simmozheim, and one village, Büchelbronn. Simmozheim is in a municipal association with the municipalities of Althengstett, Gechingen, and Ostelsheim.

Coat of arms
The coat of arms of Simmolzheim shows a lion, in yellow, standing and facing to the left with a crosier, in white, in its forepaws, below a white, six-pointed star, upon a field of red. The six-pointed star is taken from the Lords of Kröwelsau, minor feudal lords who governed Simmolzheim for the Counts of Vaihingen and later of Württemberg. The crosier is a reference to Herrenalb Abbey and first appeared in local seals in 1628. This coat of arms was in used as early as 1927 but was not adopted for official use until 1956. A corresponding municipal flag was issued to Simmozheim by the Calw district office on 29 September 1983.

Transportation

References

External links

  (in German)

Calw (district)
Württemberg